The  Institute of Child and Mother Health (ICMH) is a research institute that seeks to improve the children and mother's health sector in Bangladesh. It situated in Matuail, Dhaka. It operates under the Bangladesh government's Ministry of Health and Family Welfare (MOHFW) and was established in 1992, funded jointly by the Bangladesh government (42%) and the World Bank (58%) (the estimated cost was BDT658 million).

References

External links
 Official website

Maternity in Bangladesh
Pediatric organizations
Organizations established in 1992
Medical research institutes in Bangladesh